Beartooth may refer to:

Absaroka-Beartooth Wilderness, in Montana and Wyoming, United States
Beartooth (band), American hardcore punk band from Columbus, Ohio
Beartooth Butte Formation, geologic formation in Wyoming
Beartooth EP, album released by the Long Beach, California band, Boris Smile
Beartooth (film), a 1978 film about surviving a winter in the Beartooth Mountains
Beartooth Glacier, located in the U.S. state of Montana
Beartooth Highway, the section of U.S. Highway 212 between Red Lodge, Montana and Cooke City, Montana
Beartooth Mountain (British Columbia), in the Coast Mountains
Beartooth Mountains, in south central Montana and northwest Wyoming, U.S
Beartooth Mountain, 3,766 m peak in the Beartooth Mountains
Beartooth National Forest, established in Montana, United States
Beartooth NBC or KTVH-DT, TV station serving Helena, Montana and the surrounding area

See also
Bears Tooth